A Cross to Bear is a 2012 American drama film written by Cas Sigers-Beedles and directed by Tandria Potts and starring Danielle Deadwyler in her screen debut. The film also  starring Kim Fields, Jackie Long and Malinda Williams. The film follows homeless alcoholic (Danielle Deadwyler) and her newborn baby and a former nurse (Kim Fields) who provides shelter for her.

The film received Black Reel Awards nomination for Outstanding Screenplay in a TV Movie or Limited Series.

Cast
 Danielle Deadwyler as Erica Moses
 Storm Reid as Young Erica
 Kim Fields as Joan
 Jackie Long as Charles
 Malinda Williams as Fae

References

External links
 

American drama television films
2012 television films
2012 films
2010s English-language films